The 2004 Asian Karate Championships are the 6th edition of the Asian Karate Championships, and were held in Taoyuan, Taiwan from 6 to 8 February 2004.

Medalists

Men

Women

Medal table

See also
 List of sporting events in Taiwan

References
 Results

External links
 AKF Official Website

Asian Championships
Asian Karate Championships
Asian Karate Championships
Karate Championships